Estadio Independencia or variants may refer to:

Estadio Independencia, a stadium in Estelí, Nicaragua
Estadio La Independencia, a stadium in Tunja, Colombia
Arena Independência, a stadium in Belo Horizonte, Minas Gerais, Brazil